Putumayo Airport  is an airport serving the Putumayo River village of Puerto El Carmen de Putumayo in Sucumbíos Province, Ecuador.

See also

 List of airports in Ecuador
 Transport in Ecuador

References

External links
 HERE Maps - Putumayo
 OurAirports - Putumayo
 Putumayo

Airports in Ecuador